Champ's Ford Bridge, also known as Decatur County Bridge #124, is a historic stone arch bridge located in Clay Township, Decatur County, Indiana. It was built in 1904, and consists of four segmental arches constructed of Indiana Laurel limestone.  It measures 118 feet long and 17 feet, 4 inches, wide.

It was added to the National Register of Historic Places in 2009.

References

Road bridges on the National Register of Historic Places in Indiana
Bridges completed in 1904
Transportation buildings and structures in Decatur County, Indiana
National Register of Historic Places in Decatur County, Indiana
Stone arch bridges in the United States